This is a complete list of Scottish Statutory Instruments in 2023.

1-100 
The A76 Trunk Road (Sanquhar) (Temporary Prohibition on Waiting, Loading and Unloading) Order 2023 (S.S.I. 2023 No. 1)
The Budget (Scotland) Act 2022 Amendment Regulations 2023 (S.S.I. 2023 No. 2)
The Coronavirus (Recovery and Reform) (Scotland) Act 2022 (Commencement No. 2) Regulations 2023 (S.S.I. 2023 No. 3 (C. 1))
The Registration of Births, Still-births, Deaths and Marriages (Prescription of Forms) (Scotland) Amendment Regulations 2023 (S.S.I. 2023 No. 4)
The A702 Trunk Road (Westwater Bridge) (Temporary Prohibition on Use of Road, Temporary Weight Restriction and Temporary 30mph Speed Restriction) Order 2023 (S.S.I. 2023 No. 5)
The First-tier Tribunal for Scotland Housing and Property Chamber (Amendment) Regulations 2023 (S.S.I. 2023 No. 6)
The Packaging Waste (Data Reporting) (Scotland) Regulations 2023 (S.S.I. 2023 No. 7)
The Cost of Living (Tenant Protection) (Scotland) Act 2022 (Early Expiry and Suspension of Provisions) Regulations 2023 (S.S.I. 2023 No. 8)
The Bankruptcy and Debt Arrangement Scheme (Miscellaneous Amendment) (Scotland) Regulations 2023 (S.S.I. 2023 No. 9)
The Planning (Scotland) Act 2019 (Commencement No. 11 and Saving and Transitional Provisions) Regulations 2023 (S.S.I. 2023 No. 10 (C. 2))
The Legal Aid and Advice and Assistance (Miscellaneous Amendment) (Scotland) Regulations 2023 (S.S.I. 2023 No. 11)
The North East Scotland Trunk Roads (Temporary Prohibitions of Traffic and Overtaking and Temporary Speed Restrictions) Order 2023 (S.S.I. 2023 No. 12)
The North West Scotland Trunk Roads (Temporary Prohibitions of Traffic and Overtaking and Temporary Speed Restrictions) Order 2023 (S.S.I. 2023 No. 13)
The South West Scotland Trunk Roads (Temporary Prohibitions of Traffic and Overtaking and Temporary Speed Restrictions) Order 2023 (S.S.I. 2023 No. 14)
The South East Scotland Trunk Roads (Temporary Prohibitions of Traffic and Overtaking and Temporary Speed Restrictions) Order 2023 (S.S.I. 2023 No. 15)
The Winter Heating Assistance (Low Income) (Scotland) Regulations 2023 (S.S.I. 2023 No. 16)
The Human Trafficking and Exploitation (Scotland) Act 2015 (Commencement No. 5) Regulations 2023 (S.S.I. 2023 No. 17 (C. 3))
The Human Trafficking and Exploitation (Independent Child Trafficking Guardians) (Scotland) Regulations 2023 (S.S.I. 2023 No. 18)
The National Assistance (Assessment of Resources) Amendment (Scotland) Regulations 2023 (S.S.I. 2023 No. 19) 
The National Assistance (Sums for Personal Requirements) (Scotland) Regulations 2023 (S.S.I. 2023 No. 20)
The Local Governance (Scotland) Act 2004 (Remuneration) Amendment Regulations 2023 (S.S.I. 2023 No. 21)
The A84 Trunk Road (Main Street, Callander) (Temporary Prohibition on Use of Road) Order 2023 (S.S.I. 2023 No. 22)
The M8 (Newhouse to Easterhouse) M73 (Maryville to Mollinsburn) M74 (Daldowie to Hamilton) A725 (Shawhead to Whistleberry) Trunk Roads (Temporary Prohibitions of Traffic and Overtaking and Temporary Speed Restrictions) Order 2023 (S.S.I. 2023 No. 23)
The Public Health Scotland Amendment Order 2023 (S.S.I. 2023 No. 24)
The Council Tax (Discounts) (Scotland) Amendment Order 2023 (S.S.I. 2023 No. 25)
The Non-Domestic Rating (Valuation of Sites of Reverse Vending Machines) (Scotland) Regulations 2023 (S.S.I. 2023 No. 26)
The Diligence against Earnings (Variation) (Scotland) Regulations 2023 (S.S.I. 2023 No. 27)
The Non-Domestic Rates (Restriction of Relief) (Scotland) Regulations 2023 (S.S.I. 2023 No. 28)
The Non-Domestic Rate (Scotland) Order 2023 (S.S.I. 2023 No. 29)
The Non-Domestic Rates (Levying and Miscellaneous Amendment) (Scotland) Regulations 2023 (S.S.I. 2023 No. 30)
The Non-Domestic Rates (Transitional Relief) (Scotland) Regulations 2023 (S.S.I. 2023 No. 31)
The Valuation for Rating (Plant and Machinery) (Scotland) Amendment Regulations 2023 (S.S.I. 2023 No. 32)
The Road Works (Reinstatement Quality Plans, Qualifications of Supervisors and Operatives and Miscellaneous Amendments) (Scotland) Regulations 2023 (S.S.I. 2023 No. 33)
The Personal Injuries (NHS Charges) (Amounts) (Scotland) Amendment Regulations 2023 (S.S.I. 2023 No. 34)
The Town and Country Planning (General Permitted Development and Use Classes) (Scotland) Miscellaneous Amendment Order 2023 (S.S.I. 2023 No. 35)
The Council Tax (Exempt Dwellings) (Scotland) Amendment Order 2023 (S.S.I. 2023 No. 36)
The Education (Scotland) Act 1980 (Modification) Regulations 2023 (S.S.I. 2023 No. 37)
The Council Tax Reduction and Council Tax (Discounts) (Miscellaneous Amendment) (Scotland) Regulations 2023 (S.S.I. 2023 No. 38)
The Sexual Offences Act 2003 (Prescribed Police Stations) (Scotland) Amendment Regulations 2023 (S.S.I. 2023 No. 39)
The First-tier Tribunal for Scotland Local Taxation Chamber and Upper Tribunal for Scotland (Rules of Procedure) (Miscellaneous Amendment) Regulations 2023  (S.S.I. 2023 No. 40) 
The North East Scotland Trunk Roads (Temporary Prohibitions of Traffic and Overtaking and Temporary Speed Restrictions) (No. 2) Order 2023 (S.S.I. 2023 No. 41) 
The North West Scotland Trunk Roads (Temporary Prohibitions of Traffic and Overtaking and Temporary Speed Restrictions) (No. 2) Order 2023 (S.S.I. 2023 No. 42) 
The South East Scotland Trunk Roads (Temporary Prohibitions of Traffic and Overtaking and Temporary Speed Restrictions) (No. 2) Order 2023 (S.S.I. 2023 No. 43) 
The South West Scotland Trunk Roads (Temporary Prohibitions of Traffic and Overtaking and Temporary Speed Restrictions) (No. 2) Order 2023 (S.S.I. 2023 No. 44) 
The First-tier Tribunal for Scotland (Transfer of Functions of Valuation Appeals Committees) Regulations 2023 (S.S.I. 2023 No. 45) 
The First-tier Tribunal for Scotland (Transfer of Functions of the Council Tax Reduction Review Panel) Regulations 2023 (S.S.I. 2023 No. 46) 
The First-tier Tribunal for Scotland Local Taxation Chamber and Upper Tribunal for Scotland (Composition) Regulations 2023 (S.S.I. 2023 No. 47) 
The Upper Tribunal for Scotland (Transfer of Valuation for Rating Appeal Functions of the Lands Tribunal for Scotland) Regulations 2023 (S.S.I. 2023 No. 48)
The Criminal Justice (Scotland) Act 2016 (Commencement No. 7) Order 2023 (S.S.I. 2023 No. 49 (C. 4)) 
The Scottish Landfill Tax (Standard Rate and Lower Rate) Order 2023 (S.S.I. 2023 No. 50) 
The Abusive Behaviour and Sexual Harm (Scotland) Act 2016 (Commencement No. 3, Transitional and Saving Provisions) Regulations 2023 (S.S.I. 2023 No. 51 (C. 5))  
The Water and Sewerage Services to Dwellings (Collection of Unmetered Charges by Local Authority) (Scotland) Order 2023 (S.S.I. 2023 No. 52)  
The Marriage and Marriage Registration (Prescription of Forms) (Scotland) Amendment Regulations 2023 (S.S.I. 2023 No. 53)  
The M8 (Newhouse to Easterhouse) M73 (Maryville to Mollinsburn) A8 (Newhouse to Bargeddie) A725 (Shawhead to Whistleberry) Trunk Roads (Temporary Prohibitions of Traffic and Overtaking and Temporary Speed Restrictions) Order 2023 (S.S.I. 2023 No. 54)  
The Marriage Between Civil Partners (Procedure for Change and Fees) (Scotland) Amendment Regulations 2023 (S.S.I. 2023 No. 55)  
The A84/A85 Trunk Road (Main Street, Callander) (Temporary Prohibition on Use, Waiting, Loading and Unloading) Order 2023 (S.S.I. 2023 No. 56) 
Act of Sederunt (Rules of the Court of Session 1994 Amendment) (Court Sittings) 2023 (S.S.I. 2023 No. 57)
The Private Residential Tenancies and Assured Tenancies (Prescribed Notices and Forms) (Temporary Modifications) (Scotland) Regulations 2023 (S.S.I. 2023 No. 58)  
The Genetically Modified Food and Feed (Authorisations and Modifications of Authorisations) (Scotland) Regulations 2023 (S.S.I. 2023 No. 59) 
The A9 Trunk Road (Killiecrankie) (Temporary Prohibition on Use of Road) Order 2023 (S.S.I. 2023 No. 60) 
Act of Adjournal (Criminal Procedure Rules 1996 Amendment) (Sexual Harm Prevention Orders) 2023 (S.S.I. 2023 No. 61) 
Act of Sederunt (Summary Applications, Statutory Applications and Appeals etc. Rules 1999 Amendment) (Sexual Harm Prevention Orders and Sexual Risk Orders) 2023 (S.S.I. 2023 No. 62) 
The Non-Domestic Rates (Transitional Relief) (Scotland) Amendment Regulations 2023 (S.S.I. 2023 No. 63)
The Non-Domestic Rates (Scotland) Act 2020 (Transitional Provision) Regulations 2023 (S.S.I. 2023 No. 64) 
The Building (Scotland) Amendment (No. 2) Regulations 2022 (Amendment) Regulations 2023  (S.S.I. 2023 No. 65)
The Children’s Hearings (Scotland) Act 2011 (Safeguarders Panel) Amendment Regulations 2023 (S.S.I. 2023 No. 66)
The Community Care (Personal Care and Nursing Care) (Scotland) Amendment Regulations 2023 (S.S.I. 2023 No. 67)
 The Local Government Finance (Scotland) Order 2023 (S.S.I. 2023 No. 68)
The Environmental Regulation (Enforcement Measures) (Scotland) Amendment Order 2023 (S.S.I. 2023 No. 69)
The A85 Trunk Road (Comrie) (Temporary Prohibition on Waiting, Loading and Unloading) Order 2023 (S.S.I. 2023 No. 70)
The A77 Trunk Road (Main Street, Ballantrae) (Temporary Prohibition on Waiting) Order 2023 (S.S.I. 2023 No. 71)
The Offensive Weapons Act 2019 (Commencement No. 3) (Scotland) Regulations 2023 (S.S.I. 2023 No. 72 (C. 6))
The Civic Government (Scotland) Act 1982 (Licensing of Short-term Lets) (Amendment) Order 2023 (S.S.I. 2023 No. 73)
The Education (Scotland) Act 2016 (Commencement No. 6) Regulations 2023 (S.S.I. 2023 No. 74 (C. 7))
Act of Sederunt (Lands Valuation Appeal Court) 2023 (S.S.I. 2023 No. 75)
Act of Sederunt (Valuation Appeal Rules Amendment) 2023 (S.S.I. 2023 No. 76)
The Heat Networks (Scotland) Act 2021 (Commencement No. 2) Regulations 2023 (S.S.I. 2023 No. 77 (C. 8))
The Food Additives, Food Flavourings and Novel Foods (Authorisations) (Scotland) Regulations 2023 (S.S.I. 2023 No. 78)
The Disclosure (Scotland) Act 2020 (Commencement No. 2) Regulations 2023 (S.S.I. 2023 No. 79 (C. 9))
The National Smart Ticketing Advisory Board (Scotland) Regulations 2023 (S.S.I. 2023 No. 80)
Not Allocated (S.S.I. 2023 No. 81)
The Cost of Living (Tenant Protection) (Scotland) Act 2022 (Amendment of Expiry Dates and Rent Cap Modification) Regulations 2023 (S.S.I. 2023 No. 82)

References 

2023
Statutory Instruments
Scotland Statutory Instruments